Operation Dwarka was a naval operation by the Pakistan Navy to attack the Indian coastal town of Dwarka on 7 and 8 September 1965. This instance was the first engagement by the Pakistan Navy in any of the Indo-Pakistan Wars.

As the Indo-Pakistani War of 1965 broke out between India and Pakistan over Kashmir, the armies and air forces of both nations were involved in intense fighting in the regions of Punjab and Kashmir. To relieve pressure on the southern front, Pakistan decided to send its navy to launch a strike on the Indian coast.  The primary objective of the attack ostensibly was to destroy the radar station at Dwarka which was believed by Pakistani naval intelligence to have a Huff-Duff beacon to guide Indian bombers. Pakistani high command also hoped to divert the operations of the Indian Air Force away from the north.

Objectives
The mission objectives of the Pakistan Navy were:
 To draw heavy enemy units out of Bombay for the submarine  to attack.
 To destroy the radar installation at Dwarka.
 To lower Indian morale.
 To divert the Indian Air Force's efforts away from the North.
However, the Pakistan Navy failed to achieve these objectives.

Operation
On the night of 7 September, the Pakistan Navy launched its assault on Western Indian shores. Dwarka was chosen for its proximity  from the Karachi Port, its relatively weak defences and historical political prominence. The plan called for a fleet of seven naval vessels to shell the town of Dwarka. The attack was aimed at luring the heavy ships anchored in Bombay into attacking the Pakistani ships to enable the submarine PNS Ghazi lurking in the Arabian Sea to engage and sink the Indian ships. The bombardment continued past midnight.

The Indian warships harbored in Bombay were under refit and were unable to sortie, nor did Ghazi encounter active combatants on the West coast. According to Pakistani sources, the objective of diverting the Indian Air Force from attacking Pakistan's southern front worked as air raids on the city of Karachi ceased. This was presumed to be due also to the lack of availability of the radar guidance, which Pakistan claimed was damaged in the attack. However, Indian sources reject this and say the radar was undamaged and the Indian Air Force never engaged in any offensive operations in the area during the war.

The Indian Navy's official version of events is that, around 23:55 hours, the Pakistani vessels fired on Dwarka for more than 20 minutes. The ships fired around 50 shells each, which included 5.25 inch rounds fired by the Pakistani cruiser PNS Babur. The report adds that most shells fell between the temple and the railway station, which lay  from the lighthouse. Some buildings were hit, with the Railway Guest House suffering significant damage along with a cement factory.

The radar installation was shelled during the bombardment but neither was the radar damaged nor were there any casualties according to Indian sources. The frigate INS Talwar was in nearby Okha Port undergoing repairs and did not intervene. Hiranandani's history of the Indian Navy states that:

A total of 40 unexploded shells were also recovered intact. The shells bore the mark "INDIAN ORDNANCE"; these were dated from the 1940s before the Partition of India into India and Pakistan.

Radio Pakistan, however, transmitted that Dwarka was badly damaged.

Naval command

The following is the list of commanding officers of the operation:
Commodore S.M. Anwar, OTC – Officer Commanding of Operation Dwarka and the Commander of the Pakistan Fleet (COMPAK)
Captain MAK Lodhi – Commanding Officer of PNS Babur, the cruiser.
Captain A Hanif – Commanding Officer of PNS Khaibar, the destroyer.
Commander IH Malik – Commanding Officer of PNS Badr, the frigate.
Commander KM Hussain – Commanding Officer of PNS Jahangir, the destroyer.
Commander Iqbal F. Quadir – Commanding Officer of PNS Alamgir, the destroyer.
Commander SZ Shamsie – Commanding Officer of PNS Shah Jahan, the destroyer.
Commander Amir Aslam – Commanding Officer of PNS Tippu Sultan, the destroyer.
Commander Karamat Rahman Niazi –  Commanding Officer of PNS Ghazi, the submarine.
Commander Muhammad Ismail –  Commander Signals, PNS Tippu Sultan, the destroyer.

Aftermath
For some, Operation Dwarka was a significant naval operation of the 1965 war, but others considered it a nuisance raid or of little strategic value. The Ministry of Defence had issued written instructions which ordered the Indian Navy "not to proceed two hundred miles beyond Bombay nor North of the parallel of Porbander". The lack of response by the Indian Navy to the attack on Dwarka led to questions being asked in the Indian parliament and a challenge to be answered by others. The Chief of Naval Staff, Vice Admiral B.S. Soman was restrained from retaliation for the Dwarka raid by the Defence Minister. Of the Indian Navy's 23 ships, ten were under refit in Bombay, including the Vikrant, the cruiser Delhi, three destroyers and two frigates. An Indian source explained this by saying that the Indian government did not want to get into a naval conflict with Pakistan, but wished to restrict the war to a land-based conflict. PNS Ghazi continued to patrol Kachchh and Bombay coasts spotting aircraft positions when snorkeling.

The Dwarka raid, as per an Indian historian G. M Hiranandani, led to the procurement of missile boats by the Indian Navy from the Soviet Union for the Defense of Kutch. These were subsequently used by India in Operation Trident in the 1971 war. However, he attributes the expansion of the Indian Navy in the period 1965 to 1975 to the post-1962 planned expansion of the Indian Navy with many ships being negotiated and purchased from the Soviet Union prior to the war.

Popular culture
In 1998, Inter Services Public Relations (ISPR) financed and produced the historical dramatization film of the operation named, Operation Dwarka, 1965, which was based on this incident. The film was directed by Pakistani film director Qasim Jalali and it was written by Hameed Kashmiri.

See also
Indo-Pakistani War of 1965
Indo-Pakistani Naval War of 1971

Notes

References

Bibliography
 

Dwarka
Indo-Pakistani War of 1965
Pakistan Navy
Dwarka
Dwarka